Jacob Hoffman (1881–1956) was born in Pápa, Hungary.

Biography
In Pressburg, where the phrase chadash asur min haTorah (the new is forbidden by the Torah) originated as a contra- modernist slogan, the pursuit of secular studies was discouraged. Yet, Rabbi Hoffman, always an original thinker, exhibited his individualism at an early age. As a yeshivah student, he did not participate in the institution of “days,” the practice whereby students were hosted for daily meals in different homes. He studied privately and received his matriculation diploma, which enabled him to earn a Ph.D. at the University of Vienna. His doctoral dissertation was entitled “Halachic Elements in the Koran.” He expressed his independence in other ways as well. While still in Pressburg, he joined the Zionist movement even though most yeshivot, including the Pressburg yeshivah, were anti-Zionist. In 1904, when Theodor Herzl died, Rabbi Hoffman delivered a public eulogy. This fiercely rugged individualism would mark Rabbi Hoffman's entire rabbinic career.

Hoffman's life spanned a period in which the Jewish community experienced cataclysmic changes, such as the holocaust the establishment of the state of Israel, and growth of secularism. After ascending to the chief rabbinate of Radauti in 1912, Hoffman began reaching out to the secular and even anti-religious communities. His defense of the non-religious left a lasting impression on all who knew him.

A test of Hoffman's tenacity and independence came in 1923 when he was invited to serve as rabbi of the Jewish community (Judische Gemeinde) in Frankfurt am Main. There he succeeded the late Rabbi Nehemiah Nobel (the teacher of Franz Rosenzweig) in the position previously held by the illustrious Rabbi Márkus Horovitz, the talmid muvhak of Rabbi Azriel Hildesheimer.

In this position,  Hoffman presided over a community with a vast array of community services including kashrut, mikvaot, etc. Additionally, he served as the head of the Rabbinical court (av beit din) of the community and head of the Hoffmansche Yeshiva. Rabbi Hoffman's kehillah existed alongside another Orthodox community of Frankfurt am Main, Adas Yeshurun, founded by Rabbi Samson Raphael Hirsch. During Rabbi Hoffman's tenure, Rabbi Shlomo Breuer, the son-in-law of Rabbi Hirsch, served as the rabbi of Adas Yeshurun. The very existence of two kehillot (communities) side by side, each with its own system of kashrut, for example, can lead to rivalry and conflict. In this particular case, however, there was another element that institutionalized the conflict — the issue of Austritt (secession).

When, some 50–60 years earlier, Rabbi Hirsch began rejuvenating Orthodoxy in Germany, he believed that success would only come by starting anew. That meant seceding from the larger Jewish community—which included Reform Jews—and creating a totally independent community. This independent community, Rabbi Hirsch insisted, should represent pure and authentic Orthodoxy and be recognized by the government for doing so. To Rabbi Hirsch, any Orthodox community that belonged to an umbrella organization with heterodox groups had no right to represent authentic Torah Judaism. This caused a rift within German Orthodoxy, for while many within the Orthodox community aligned themselves with Rabbi Hirsch's philosophy, many others did not.

Rabbi Hoffman's kehillah did not separate itself from the general community, and therefore, in the eyes of those in Adas Yeshurun, did not represent authentic Orthodoxy. Members of the Adas Yeshurun community constantly attempted to delegitimize Rabbi Hoffman.

Rabbi Hoffman's lifelong espousal of the philosophy of Jewish peoplehood also explains his deep involvement with the Zionist and Religious Zionist movements (Mizrachi), which were not popular with German Orthodoxy. In fact, Rabbi Hoffman's predecessor, Rabbi Nobel, though an ardent Zionist, was quite low-key about his Zionist activities. Rabbi Hoffman, however, publicly immersed himself in Zionist activity. So much so, that he was chosen to head the  Mizrachi movement  in Germany. He provided the movement with ideological direction.

When Dr. Benno Jacob, a noted Bible scholar and leader of Reform Jewry, published an article questioning the religious significance of settling in Israel and arguing that the leadership of the old yishuv was not interested in restoring religious life in the Land of Israel, Hoffman responded, “The life of religion in the Land of Israel will not be formed by Zionist leaders. It will be formed by throngs of Jews settling there. The enrichment of Jewish values will occur when a society of Jews will entrench themselves and be rooted with their emotions and thoughts on the holy land of the Land of Israel...To involve one’s self in the settlement of the land of Israel is a religious obligation.”

As Rabbi Hoffman became more active in the Mizrachi movement, he took on leadership positions. Repeating his theme of Klal Yisrael, Rabbi Hoffman elucidated the Mizrachi stance. When Rabbi Avigdor Amiel, the chief rabbi of Antwerp and a leader in the Mizrachi movement, asserted that the differences between Agudah and Mizrachi were not ideological and that Mizrachi's joining the World Zionist Organization was “an empty formality,” Rabbi Hoffman responded: “Our joining the Zionist movement is to us more than a formality. It is an inseparable part of Mizrachi ideology to strengthen the idea of Klal Yisrael. And there is no difference whether the issue is one within the local Jewish community or whether it affects World Jewry. It is not sufficient to propagate an ideology in our own homogenous circles. We believe that it is our duty to be active in various organizations for our goals and to bring out into the public domain the religious cultural values that were created.”

This statement encapsulates Rabbi Hoffman's ideology: a strong belief in Zionism and a fervent commitment to remain part of the larger Jewish community. When the Nazis came to power in 1933, it took time for the Jewish community to understand the implications of this transfer of power. There were many, among them leaders of the Orthodox Jewish community, who believed that “this too shall pass.” Rabbi Hoffman sensed the impending disaster. While he did not want to cause people to panic, he could not allow his community to be lulled into slumber either. Thus, in his public statements, he was forced to juggle between these poles. Soon, however, it dawned on the German Jewish community that the situation was rapidly deteriorating. With the passing of the Nuremberg laws in 1935, the complacency of the Jewish leadership was shattered. During this terribly difficult period, Rabbi Hoffman took on a greater leadership role. Despite the disapproval of the Agudah and the separatists (those who advocated secession), Rabbi Hoffman was chosen to be the sole representative of Orthodox Jewry in the nine-person ruling body of the Reichsvertretung der Deutschen Juden (the supreme representative body of German Jewry in its dealings with the Nazi regime). He became involved in hatzalah work (acquiring certificates for his yeshivah students to go to Palestine) and spoke in cities throughout Germany to help raise the morale of the Jewish community. During this period he found time to publish papers on such topics as Maimonides as Master of Halachah.

In the spring of 1937, Rabbi Hoffman's tenure in Frankfurt am Main came to an abrupt end. Without warning, the Gestapo ordered Rabbi Hoffman expelled from Germany on a trumped-up charge that he had engaged in activities that were bound to upset the civil order. None of the efforts to overturn this decision was successful. On March 27, he was deported to Austria.

In 1938, Rabbi Hoffman went to the United States on a mission on behalf of German Jewry. When the Nazi government came to power, one of its first measures was to prohibit shechitah (ritual slaughter). Inevitably, the price of imported kosher meat skyrocketed. Upon his arrival in the United States, Rabbi Hoffman hoped to raise funds to provide German Jewish institutions, including hospitals, old-age homes and yeshivot, with kosher meat.

Shortly after arriving in New York, Rabbi Hoffman became the rabbi of Congregation Ohab Zedek on Manhattan's West Side. Although the synagogue was in an area inhabited by many Hungarian Jewish families, Rabbi Hoffman did not adjust easily. Already in his late fifties, he had to face a new country and language. Furthermore, the “empire” over which he had presided in Frankfurt could not be recreated. While in Frankfurt, members of the kehillah naturally deferred to the chief rabbi, in the United States, congregants had an entirely different relationship with their rabbi. In spite of all these difficulties, Rabbi Hoffman threw himself into his new role. He helped found Manhattan Day School; he became active in hatzalah work; he took on new leadership roles in the Zionist and Mizrachi movements.

With the end of World War II, Rabbi Hoffman turned to mobilizing American Jewry in the struggle to establish Medinat Yisrael. In 1954, he moved to Israel, realizing his dream of aliyah. He died in 1956, after serving as a Jewish leader par excellence for almost 50 years. Tikvat Yaakov, a Bnei Akiva yeshivah in Israel, is named for him.

References

External links
Guide to the Jakob Hoffmann Collection at the Leo Baeck Institute, New York.

1881 births
1956 deaths
American Orthodox rabbis
Hungarian Orthodox rabbis
People from Pápa
Religious Zionist Orthodox rabbis